Jerris Leonard (January 17, 1931July 27, 2006) was an American lawyer and Republican politician.  He served 8 years in the Wisconsin State Senate (1961–1969) and four years in the State Assembly (1957–1961), representing northern Milwaukee County.

Background and personal life 
Leonard was born on January 17, 1931, to Jerris and Marie Leonard in Chicago, Illinois. His family moved to Milwaukee, Wisconsin, where he graduated from Rufus King High School. He earned a B.S. in business administration in 1952 from Marquette University, and in 1955 earned an LL.B. from Marquette University Law School.

On August 22, 1953, he married Mariellen C. Mathie, with whom he had six children. He died on July 27, 2006, in Bethesda, Maryland.

Legislative service 
Leonard was first elected to the Wisconsin State Assembly in 1956 to succeed William Kasik from the 19th Milwaukee County district, which included the Town of Milwaukee (but not the City of Milwaukee itself), Bayside, Fox Point, Glendale, Granville, River Hills, Shorewood, and Whitefish Bay. He served two terms, and advanced to the Wisconsin State Senate in 1960, serving two terms (1961–1969). He ran against United States Senator Gaylord Nelson in the 1968 United States Senate election and was defeated.

Federal service 
He was in the United States Department of Justice 1969–1973 during the administration of President Richard Nixon, serving as the first administrator of the Law Enforcement Assistance Administration.

United Sciences of America, Inc. 
In the 1980s Leonard served as president of United Sciences of America, Inc., a multi-level marketing company selling nutritional supplements, which was accused of deceptive practices and false claims, and eventually filed bankruptcy.

References

Sources 
 Papers of Jerris Leonard in the Wisconsin State Historical Society
 Wisconsin Senate Joint Resolution in memory of Jerris Leonard

1931 births
2006 deaths
Marquette University alumni
Marquette University Law School alumni
Republican Party members of the Wisconsin State Assembly
Politicians from Chicago
Wisconsin lawyers
Republican Party Wisconsin state senators
Lawyers from Chicago
20th-century American politicians
Nixon administration personnel
United States Assistant Attorneys General for the Civil Rights Division
Rufus King International High School alumni